Plesiadapiformes ("Adapid-like" or "near Adapiformes") is an extinct basal Pan-Primates group, as sister to the rest of the pan-primates. The pan-primates together with the Dermoptera form the Primatomorpha, Purgatorius may not be a primate as an extinct sister to the rest of the Dermoptera or a separate, more basal stem pan-primate branch. Even with Purgatorius removed, the crown primates may even have emerged in this group.

Plesiadapiformes first appear in the fossil record between 65 and 55 million years ago, although many were extinct by the beginning of the Eocene. They may have been the first mammals to have finger nails in place of claws. In 1990, K.C. Beard attempted to link the Plesiadapiformes with the order Dermoptera. They proposed that paromomyid Phenacolemur had digital proportions of the fossil indicated gliding habits similar to that of colugos.

In the following simplified cladogram, the crown primates are found to be highly derived Plesiadapiformes, possibly as sister of the Plesiadapoidea. The crown primates are cladistically granted here into the Plesiadapiformes, and the 'plesiadapiformes' become a junior synonym of the primates. With this tree, the plesiadapiformes are not literally extinct (in the sense of having no surviving descendants). The crown primates are also called "Euprimates" in this context.

Alternatively, in 2018, the plesiadapiform were proposed to be more related to Dermoptera, or roughly corresponding to Primatomorpha with both Dermoptera and the primates emerging within this group. Also in a 2020 paper, the primates and Dermoptera were jointly considered sister to the plesiadapiform Purgatoriidae, resulting in the following phylogenetic tree.

Traditionally, they were regarded as a separate extinct order of Primatomorpha, but it now appears that groups such as the extant primates and/or the Dermoptera have emerged in the group.

Similarly, in 2021 the Purgatoriidae were found to be sister to Dermoptera, while the rest of the Plesiadapiformes appear to be sister to the remaining primates:

One possible classification table of plesiadapiform families is listed below.

PLESIADAPIFORMES
 Family Micromomyidae
 Superfamily Paromomyoidea
 Family Paromomyidae
 Family Picromomyidae
 Family Palaechthonidae
 Family Microsyopidae
 Superfamily Plesiadapoidea
 Family Carpolestidae
 Family Chronolestidae
 Family Picrodontidae
 Family Plesiadapidae
 Family Saxonellidae

References

External links 
Mikko's Phylogeny Archive

 
Mammal orders
Paleocene first appearances
Eocene extinctions
Paraphyletic groups